Thomas C. Russell Field  is a city-owned public-use airport located two nautical miles (4 km) southwest of the central business district of Alexander City, a city in Tallapoosa County, Alabama, United States.

This airport is included in the FAA's National Plan of Integrated Airport Systems for 2011–2015 and 2009–2013, both of which categorized it as a general aviation facility.

Facilities and aircraft 
Thomas C. Russell Field covers an area of 293 acres (119 ha) at an elevation of 686 feet (209 m) above mean sea level. It has one runway designated 18/36 with an asphalt surface measuring 5,422 by 96 feet (1,653 x 29 m).

For the 12-month period ending December 9, 2009, the airport had 33,312 aircraft operations, an average of 91 per day: 91% general aviation and 9% military. At that time there were 26 aircraft based at this airport: 69.% single-engine, 27% multi-engine and 4% helicopter.

See also 
 List of airports in Alabama

References

External links 
 Airport page at Alexander City website
 Aerial image as of March 1997 from USGS The National Map
 
 

Airports in Alabama
Transportation buildings and structures in Tallapoosa County, Alabama